Winners of the Women's World Award, sponsored by the World Awards organization headed by former Soviet Union President Mikhail Gorbachev, intended for women who have influenced the world by their work in areas such as society or politics. The award has been given since 2004. No monetary prize is attached; the prize token has shape of a glass female silhouette. The corresponding prize for men, although no longer observed, was called 'Men's World Day' until it was terminated in 2006. There is also a gender neutral event called 'Save The World awards' which awards equal numbers of men and women.

Awards

2009 
March 5, 2009 in Vienna, Austria;
World Achievement Award: Betty Williams
World Actress Award: Monica Bellucci
World Entertainment Award: Kelly Clarkson
World Hope Award: Nujood Ali
World Lifetime Achievement Award: Marianne Faithfull
World Fashion Award: Angela Missioni
World Business Award: Marilyn Carlson Nelson
World Tolerance Award: Claudia Cardinale
World Artist Award: Anastacia
World Social Award: Esther Mujawayo

2006 
October 14, 2006 in New York City, U.S.A.; awardees include:
World Achievement Award: Shana Dale
World Charity Award: Sharon Stone
World Entertainment Award: Whoopi Goldberg
World Hope Award: Stella Deetjen
World Lifetime Achievement Award: Susan Sarandon
World Social Award: Lucy Liu
World Style Award: Claudia Schiffer
World Tolerance Award: Queen Noor of Jordan
World Artist Award: Mary J. Blige
Woman of the year: Robin Herbert

2005
November 29, 2005 in Leipzig, Germany, were awarded:
World Achievement Award: Alison Lapper
World Actress Award: Teri Hatcher
World Artist Award for Lifetime Achievement: Catherine Deneuve
World Arts Award: Lisa Stansfield
World Fashion Award: Donatella Versace
World Fashion Icon Award: Linda Evangelista
World Media Award: Sabine Christiansen
World Social Award: Sarah, Duchess of York
World Tolerance Award: Benazir Bhutto
Woman of the Year: Margarete Gehring representing the about 5500 mothers of the SOS Children's Villages

2004
June 9, 2004 in Hamburg, Germany, were awarded:
World Achievement Award: Bianca Jagger
World Actress Award: Diane Kruger
World Artist Award for Lifetime Achievement: Whitney Houston and Dionne Warwick
World Artists Award: Nena
World Arts Award: Cher
World Business Award: Katarina Witt
World Charity Award: Ute-Henriette Ohoven (Henriette Ohoven)
World Connection Award: Valentina Tereshkova
World Entertainment Award: Oprah Winfrey
World Fashion Award: Vivienne Westwood
World Fashion Icon Award: Naomi Campbell
World Media Award: Christiane Amanpour
World Social Award: Waris Dirie
World Style Award: Nadja Auermann
World Tolerance Award: Iris Berben
Woman of the Year: Agnes Wessalowski

See also

 List of awards honoring women
 Men's World Day up to 2006

External links 
 http://www.womensworldawards.com

Awards honoring women
Awards established in 2004